Akko may refer to:

Places
 Acre, Israel
 Akko, Nigeria
 Hakko, Armenia

People
 Acco (Senones), Gallic ruler who revolted against Julius Caesar in the 50BCs
 Akiko Wada (born 1950), Japanese singer and television performer
 Akko, vocalist of Japanese pop group My Little Lover

Fictional characters
 Akko(-chan), the heroine of the manga Himitsu no Akko-chan
 Atsuko "Akko" Kagari, the protagonist of the Little Witch Academia franchise

Other uses
 Akko (fish), a genus of gobies in subfamily Gobiinae

See also

 
 Acre (disambiguation)
 Siege of Acre (disambiguation)
 ACCO (disambiguation)
 Acho, a surname
 Aco (disambiguation)
 Ak (disambiguation)
 Akho, 17th-century Gujarati poet
 Ako (disambiguation)